Goldsmiths Students' Union (GSU) is the students' union for Goldsmiths, University of London. It offers services to students including advice, sports clubs and activities as well as a list of entertainments and events and a 1000 capacity live music venue. It is also a campaigning students' union, with representatives attending many marches throughout the academic year.

Positions

Recycling and the environment
Since 2005, GSU has recycled all paper waste and since 2007 has recycled all paper, glass and plastic. The union offices also have facilities in place for the recycling of ink and toner cartridges as well as mobile phones and similar devices.

Democracy

Elected positions
GSU is democratically run by elected officers. Each spring, Goldsmiths students elect candidates based on submitted manifestos for a variety of positions. These consist of four full-time positions that are remunerated and 14 part-time positions. The elections are independently verified by a returning officer from the National Union of Students of the United Kingdom.

Annual report
Each year the students' union publishes its Annual Impact Report which outlines to all stakeholders the work it has been doing throughout the year, its campaigns and its achievements. The document is designed in house and present to the college management board as well as being made available to students.

Student involvement
GSU helps support 50+ student run clubs and societies and over 20 competitive and non-competitive sports teams.

Commercial services
GSU operates a number of commercial services in order to raise funding for the non-commercial aspects to its function. Without these sources of income the students' union would have to rely solely on the grant provided by Goldsmiths, University of London.

Students' Union Shop
The Students' Union Shop is located in the Richard Hoggart Building of Goldsmiths, University of London. It sells snacks and non-alcoholic beverages as well as arts supplies and materials.

Students' Union Cafe
The Students' Union Cafe is located on the 1st floor of the SU Building and sells hot food, snacks, and beverages.

SU Bar
The SU Bar is the Union's 1000 capacity live music and club venue hosting two licensed bars, a night club, common room and cafe area as well as conference room and multi-faith prayer room. The Students' Union primarily organises student-led events but also hosts big gigs like the Mystery Jets, Metronomy, Late of the Pier, Shy Child all player. Blur played on 22 June 2009. Two of Blur's members, Graham Coxon and Alex James, had previously studied at Goldsmiths before forming the band.

Controversy
In October 2014, the union faced critical coverage in the student newspaper The Tab after voting down a proposal to commemorate wars and genocides, including Holocaust Memorial Day and Armenian Genocide Day, with Education Officer Sara Alfy describing it as "Eurocentric" and "not broad enough." According to the union, Alfy offered to help put forward a redrafted version of the motion for the following Student Assembly meeting to ensure it was more inclusive and "not focused on European history". The Union issued a statement claiming "Redrafting motions and re-entering them at a later date isn’t unusual in Students’ Unions and shouldn’t be misinterpreted as opposition."

In February 2015, feminist comedian Kate Smurthwaite's gig was cancelled after some members of Goldsmiths Feminist society threatened to picket the event over Smurthwaite's controversial views in favour of the Nordic Model of sex work criminalisation.

In 2015, the student union Welfare and Diversity Officer, Bahar Mustafa, sparked a public outcry by banning white people and men from a student union event. Mustafa was accused of racism and sexism, which she denied. A group of students petitioned for a vote of no confidence in her, but the petition was signed by less than 3% of the student body and therefore failed to trigger a referendum.

In 2019, Goldsmiths Anti-Racist Action occupied the college's old Deptford Town Hall for 137 days following numerous complaints about on campus racism. SU officers Mona Mounir and Sara Bafo were critical of the resulting report INSIDER-OUTSIDER The Role of Race in Shaping the Experiences of Black and Minority Ethnic Students by Sofia Akel.

See also
 The Leopard

References

External links
Goldsmiths Students' Union official website
Goldsmiths, University of London External Site

Goldsmiths, University of London
Students' unions in London
Race-related controversies in the United Kingdom